Rusch is a surname. Notable people with the surname include:

Adolf Rusch (1435–1489), notable German printer and publisher
Arthur Rusch, American politician
Bob Rusch (born 1943), American jazz critic and record producer
Frank Rusch (born 1949), researcher on self-instructional strategies, coworker and natural supports, benefit-cost analysis
Glendon Rusch (born 1974), left-handed former Major League Baseball pitcher
Jerry Rusch (1943–2003), American jazz trumpeter
Kristine Kathryn Rusch (born 1960), American writer and editor
Nicholas J. Rusch (1822–1864), tutor, farmer, member of the Iowa Senate (1858–1860), the second Lieutenant Governor of Iowa (1860–1862), Iowa's Commissioner of Immigration, and a captain in the Union Army during the American Civil War
Paul Rusch (1897–1979), lay missionary of the Anglican Church in Japan
Thomas Rusch (born 1962), German photographer living in Berlin, Hamburg and Paris

See also
Rusch Botanical Gardens in Citrus Heights, California, USA
Rausch (disambiguation)
Reusch (disambiguation)
Ruch (disambiguation)
Rusche
Ruschein
Ruschia
Rush (disambiguation)
Ruysch (disambiguation)